DeSoto High School is a comprehensive public high school in DeSoto, Texas, United States. It is part of the DeSoto Independent School District and is classified as a 6A school by the UIL. In 2015, the school was rated "Met Standard" by the Texas Education Agency.

The district, and therefore the school, serves most of DeSoto and the Dallas County portion of Glenn Heights, and a portion of Ovilla in Dallas County, as well as a small portion of Cedar Hill.

School profile

From 1956 to 1962, DeSoto High School was located at 200 East Belt Line Road. In 1962, a new campus opened at 601 East Belt Line Road (present-day DeSoto East Junior High). As the district continued to grow, voters approved a $7.5 million bond by a vote of 445–366 in 1973 that contained a provision for the construction of a new high school.

On February 15, 1974, a groundbreaking ceremony took place at the new site, 600 Eagle Drive. The building contract was awarded to Central Texas Construction of Terrell at a cost of approximately $3,100,000. The school opened on August 16, 1976.

To relieve overcrowding, an adjoining Freshman Campus opened in 1997 to serve the district's ninth graders.

In 2011 The Dallas Morning News reported that the school "had a lower-than-expected college readiness percentage." In 2011, the district built additions to improve the school's college and career academies. The State of Texas defined "college readiness," or readiness to undergo university studies, by scores on the ACT, SAT, and 11th grade Texas Assessment of Knowledge and Skills (TAKS) tests.

DeSoto High offers International Baccalaureate, early college, and academic magnet programs to better serve the academic needs of its high-achieving students preparing to attend college.

School uniforms
In the 2005–2006 school year, DeSoto ISD began a mandatory school uniform policy at all of its schools. Formerly, the mandatory uniform was:

 Shirt - yellow, green, black, white, or gray
 Pants - khaki or black
 On Fridays, a DeSoto or college shirt may be worn with jeans.

In 2019, DeSoto ISD changed the policy and the students no longer have to wear uniforms.

Student demographics
In the 2014–2015 school year, DeSoto High had a total of 2,238 students in grades 10-12 (82% African American, 3% White, 14% Hispanic, 0.2% Asian, and 0.2% Native American).

Athletics
The DeSoto Eagles compete in the following sports:

Baseball
Basketball
Cross country
Football
Golf
Soccer
Softball
Swimming and diving
Tennis
Track and field
Volleyball
Band
Cheerleading
Wrestling

State Championships
The DeSoto Baseball team won State Championships in 1979 and 1985.

The Lady Eagle track and field team won a State Championship in 2007 followed by three consecutive State Championships in 2011, 2012, and 2013. They also won 5 straight titles in 2016, 2017, 2018, 2019 and 2021 bringing their total to 9 State Championships.

The Eagle Boys' Track and Field team won State Titles in 2012 and 2016.

The Boys' Basketball team won the Texas 5A State Championship in 2003 and 2009.  In 2016, the boys' team won the 6A State Championship, upsetting #1 ranked Atacostia High 73–54.

In 2016, the Varsity Football team won the 6A Division II State Championship in the AT&T Stadium. This was the first State Football Championship in school history.

In 2021, the Varsity Girls Basketball team won the Texas 6A State Championship over an undefeated Cypress Creek High School (Texas). This was the first Girls State Basketball Championship in school history. In 2022, the Girls Basketball team would win a repeat championship title bringing their total to two state titles.

Rivalry
For decades, DeSoto High has maintained a popular rivalry against their regional foe the Cedar Hill High School Longhorns.  The rivalry has been deemed the "Battle of Belt Line".  DeSoto has an even longer rivalry with Duncanville High School.

Marching Band
DeSoto Eagle Band is a 100+ music group that represents the school at athletic games, band competitions, parades, and other events.

Student Investigation Award
In January 2005, the school district was investigated by the press for its questionable hiring of an outside "gang consultant". The investigation focused on whether the district truly had a "gang problem" (the local police chief said it did not), or whether the consultant was creating the "problem", since the consultant stood to gain a sizeable contract if in fact a problem existed.  The result is that there was no real gang problem, and the consultant's contract was terminated.

The unique feature of the investigation was that none of the media outlets in the Dallas area had anything to do with it. The investigation was performed solely by the Eagle Eye, the DHS student newspaper. For their role in the story, four members of the newspaper staff received the Courage in Student Journalism Award for their work; the student advisor received the educator's version of the award. Both awards came with $5,000 prizes.

Notable alumni

 Erica Banks (class of 2017), rapper
 Tatum Bell (class of 1999), former running back for the Denver Broncos
 Marques Bolden (class of 2016), center, Canton Charge (G League Affiliate of the Cleveland Cavaliers), 2016 6A State Champion in basketball
 Patrick Crayton (class of 1997), former wide receiver for the Dallas Cowboys and San Diego Chargers
 Steve Foster (class of 1985), Cincinnati Reds pitcher, pitching coach of Colorado Rockies
 Cyrus Gray (class of 2008), retired running back for the Kansas City Chiefs and Denver Broncos
 Byron Hanspard (class of 1994), former running back for the Atlanta Falcons
 Tim Hendrix (class of 1983), former tight end for the Dallas Cowboys
 Ellis Hobbs (class of 2001), former cornerback, New England Patriots
 Mike Humphreys (class of 1985), retired New York Yankees outfielder
 Brian Jackson (class of 2005), former cornerback for the New York Jets New York Giants
 Tony Jerod-Eddie (class of 2008), former nose tackle for the San Francisco 49ers
 Matt Jones (class of 2013), Bank of Taiwan (basketball), 2015 National Champion for Duke University
 Chris Lacy (class of 2014), wide receiver
 Jason London (class of 1991), actor
 Jeremy London (class of 1991), actor
 Von Miller (class of 2007), linebacker for the Buffalo Bills
 Jalen Mills (class of 2012), cornerback for the New England Patriots
 Marcus Murphy (class of 2010), running back
 Zach Orr (class of 2010), Outside Linebacker coach for the Jacksonville Jaguars, former linebacker for the Baltimore Ravens
 Casey Printers (class of 1999), former quarterback for the Kansas City Chiefs
 James Proche (class of 2015), wide receiver for the Baltimore Ravens
 Laviska Shenault (class of 2017), wide receiver for the Jacksonville Jaguars
 Mark Simmons (class of 2002), former wide receiver for the San Diego Chargers
 Mike Thomas (class of 2005), former wide receiver for the Jacksonville Jaguars
 Marcus Tubbs (class of 1999), former defensive tackle for the Seattle Seahawks
 Howard Wilson (class of 2014), former cornerback for the Cleveland Browns
 Jimmy Wyrick (class of 1995), former cornerback for the Detroit Lions

References

External links

 
 DeSoto ISD

DeSoto Independent School District
Public high schools in Dallas County, Texas
DeSoto, Texas
1956 establishments in Texas
Educational institutions established in 1956